Lithuania competed at the 2013 World Championships in Athletics in Moscow, Russia, from 10–18 August 2013.

Qualification standards  
18 athletes from Lithuania in total achieved qualification standards: Marius Žiūkas (A, 20 km walk), Tadas Šuškevičius (A, 50 km walk; B, 20 km walk), Tomas Gaidamavičius (B, 50 km walk), Ričardas Rekst (B, 50 km walk), Rasa Drazdauskaitė (Marathon), Diana Lobačevskė (Marathon), Remalda Kergytė (Marathon), Živilė Balčiūnaitė (Marathon), Austra Skujytė (A, Heptathlon), Kristina Saltanovič (A, 20 km walk), Brigita Virbalytė (A, 20 km walk), Neringa Aidietytė (A, 20 km walk), Virgilijus Alekna (B, discus throw), Zinaida Sendriūtė (A, discus throw), Agnė Šerkšnienė (B, 400 m; B, 200 m), Lina Grinčikaitė (B, 100 m), Airinė Palšytė (B, high jump), Eglė Balčiūnaitė (A, 800 m).

Notes

Nations at the 2013 World Championships in Athletics
2013 in Lithuanian sport
2013